Popeda is a Finnish rock band hailing from Tampere and one of the staples of Manserock. Epe Helenius, who signed the band for Poko Rekords in 1977, called the band "Finnish Rolling Stones". Musically their style is a combination of rock 'n' roll, with humorous lyrics by their vocalist Pate Mustajärvi, often concerning girls, cars and drinking.

Popeda was founded in November 1977 by Pauli "Pate" Mustajärvi and Ilari "Ilpo" Ainiala. Popeda's 1983 album Kaasua is considered their breakthrough. Pate Mustajärvi is currently the band's only original member.

Finnish singer Erin released a single whose namesake is this particular band.

Members

Current
Pate Mustajärvi – vocals (1977–present)
Costello Hautamäki – guitars, vocals (1982–present)
Jyrki K. Melartin – bass guitar, vocals (1980–1990, 1995–present)
Pate Kivinen – keyboards (2008–present)
Lacu Lahtinen – drums, vocals (2008–present)

Past
Ilari "Ilpo" Ainiala – bassguitars (1977–1979)
Tapani "Arwo" Mikkonen – guitars (1977–1986)
Ari Puukka – guitars (1977–1981)
Kai Holm – drums (1977–1983)
Risto Lehtinen – bassguitars (1979–1981)
Kari Holm – drums (1983–2000)
Eero Pekkonen – keyboards (1983–1985)
Jukka "Jukkis" Järvinen – keyboards (1986–2000)
Timo Tapaninen – guitars (1986–1990)
Markku Petander – bassguitars (1990–1995)
Arto Rautajoki – drums (2001–2007)
Jani Kemppinen – keyboards (2001–2007)

Discography

Albums 
 Popeda (1978)
 Raswaa koneeseen (1980) (Grease to the Machine)
 Hullut koirat (1981) (Mad Dogs)
 Raakaa voimaa (1981) (Live) (Raw Power)
 Mustat enkelit (1982) (Black Angels)
 Kaasua... (1983) (Gas...)
 Harasoo (1984)
 Pohjantähden alla (1985) (Under the North Star)
 Huilut suorina (1986) (Live) (Flutes Straight)
 Ei oo valoo (1987) (There's No Light)
 Hallelujaa (1988) (Hallelujah)
 Kans'an Popeda (1990) (Nation n' Popeda)
 Svoboda (1992) (Svoboda)
 H.Ö.N.Ö. (1994) (F.O.O.L.)
 Live at the BBC (1995)
 500 cc (1997)
 Vieraissa (1999) (Sleeping around)
 Just! (2001) (Right!)
 Häkää! (2005) (Carbon Monoxide!)
 Täydelliset miehet (2008) (Perfect Men)
 Pitkä Kuuma Kesä 2010 – Live (2010) (Long Hot Summer 2010 – Live)
 Voitto (2011) (Victory)
 Museorekisterissä / Museorekisterissä – Karvanopat ja Wunderbaum (2013) (At the registry of the museum - Fuzzy dices and Wunderbaum)
 Haista...Popeda (2017) (Smell...Popeda)

Compilations 
 15 GT Golden Turbo (1986) (15 Gt Golden Turbo)
 Poko-klassikko: Popeda (1987) (Poko-Classics: Popeda)
 Peethelemin Pesäveikot (nopein saa) (1993) (Nestbrothers of Beetlehem (Fastest Gets))
 Hittejä, kersantti Karoliina! (1997) (Hits, Sergeant Karoliina!)
 Pelkkää juhlaa – 25v. Juhlakokoelma (Just Party – 25th Anniversary Collection)
30-vuotinen sota 1977–2007 (2007) (30-Year War 1977–2007)

DVDs 
 Hyvää iltaa, Tampere (2002) (Good Evening, Tampere)
 Pitkä Kuuma Kesä 2010 – Live (2010) (Long Hot Summer 2010 – Live)

Singles 
 "Mannaa mammonaa" (1997)
 "Kakskytä centtiä" (2002)
 "Ei lasten käsiin" (2004)
 "Ikurin mimmi" (2005)
 "Katsastuslaulu" (2006)
 "Reino" (2007)
 "Kuutamohullu" (2008)
 "Onhan päivä vielä huomennakin" (2008) (Finnish version of "Piangi con me" or "Let's Live for Today")
 "Elän itselleni" (2008)

See also 
List of best-selling music artists in Finland

References

External links 

The Official Site
Popeda site by Jyrki Hietanen

Finnish rock music groups